Lupadium or Loupadion was a Graeco-Roman town of ancient Mysia. It minted coins during the Byzantine period. It was a bishopric; no longer the seat a residential bishop, it remains a titular see of the Roman Catholic Church.

Its site is located near Uluabat in Asiatic Turkey.

References

Populated places in ancient Mysia
Former populated places in Turkey
Catholic titular sees in Asia
History of Bursa Province
Roman towns and cities in Turkey
Populated places of the Byzantine Empire